LandNet Rwanda Chapter is part of LandNet Africa and is a network of local Rwandan organizations and international NGO's which deals with land issues. The idea of LandNet Rwanda Chapter is to bring together academicians, policy makers and the civil society to discuss together about land issues. At the moment LandNet Rwanda is hosted by the Rwandan Initiative for Sustainable development (RISD)

Launch
LandNet Rwanda Chapter was officially launched on 21 September 2000

Land Situation in Rwanda
Rwanda is one of the poorest countries in Africa but has the highest population density of all African countries with about 370 persons/km2. The annual growth rate of Rwanda is very with 3.3% very high; the population is currently over 10 million and is expected to increase to about 13 million in 2020. Of these 10 million almost 90% are dependent on agriculture for their living, 93% of all women and 81% of all men.  
80% of the land related disputes arise from community or family levels, most of the time one piece of land is claimed by multiple groups and 90% of these disputes affect vulnerable groups, like women, who are often discriminated in land disputes concerning for example inheritance cases.

Work
Currently, the government of Rwanda is exercising a nationwide land reform called the Land Tenure Regularization Program (LTRP), which is aiming at addressing land related problems and ending gender based discrimination in land access. LandNet Rwanda Chapter is monitoring the LTRP and provides data through research for policy makers from which they can conclude the success of the LTRP. Also LandNet is reviewing existing laws and policies in order to improve them.
LandNet Rwanda Chapter trains local leaders to be able to solve land disputes peacefully and fairly.
LandNet Rwanda is organizing campaigns to inform the public about relevant land issues through sharing information among members and raising the concerns of the grassroots for advocacy and inclusion in the national policies.

Members
Currently, LandNet Rwanda Chapter has 32 members. LandNet Rwanda Chapter differentiates between core members, which often attend LandNet Rwanda meetings and actively participate in the Network and members, which just wish to share experiences or ideas about land issues without being a core member.

Steering Committee Members:

CARE International Rwanda
Action Aid International Rwanda (AAIR)
BENISHYAKA
CLADHO
COPORWA
IMBARAGA
Rural Environment and Development Organization (REDO)
Rwandese Health Environment Project Initiative (RHEPI)
Rwanda Initiative for Sustainable Development (RISD)
UGAMA CSC

General Members:

L' Association Rwandaise Pour la Défence des Droits de l’Homme (ARDHO)
The Association Rwandaise des Ecologistes "ARECO - RWANDA NZIZA"
Association des Volontaires de la Paix (AVP)
CCOAIB
Christian Aid Rwanda
DUHAMIC-ADRI
HAGURUKA
INADES
International Gorilla Conservation Programme
The Institute for Policy Analysis and Research (IPAR)
KANYARWANDA
La Ligue Rwandaise pour la Promotion et la Defense des Droits de l'Homme (LIPRODHOR)
National Unity and Reconciliation Commission
National University of Rwanda (NUR)
Office of the Ombudsman
Oxfam Rwanda Programme
REASON
Reseaux Des Femmes
Rwanda Women's Network
Rwanda Rural Rehabilitation Initiative (RWARRI)
SERUKA
TROCAIRE Rwanda

References

Organisations based in Rwanda
2000 establishments in Rwanda
Organizations established in 2000